Alister Murray Linton  (12 March 1904 – 15 August 1980) was a New Zealand surveyor, local politician, land officer, community leader, horticulturist and broadcaster.

Biography
He was born in Halcombe, Manawatu/Horowhenua, New Zealand on 12 March 1904.

He was a resident of Rotorua, where he was a councillor for six years, then Mayor for 18 years from 1953 to 1971. He stood in the  general election in the  electorate for the National Party, but was defeated by Labour's Ray Boord.

He was appointed a Commander of the Order of the British Empire in the 1965 New Year Honours.

Linton died in Rotorua in 1980, and was buried at Kauae Cemetery in Ngongotahā.

References

1904 births
1980 deaths
New Zealand horticulturists
New Zealand surveyors
New Zealand broadcasters
Mayors of Rotorua
New Zealand Commanders of the Order of the British Empire
20th-century New Zealand botanists
Burials at Kauae Cemetery
People from Halcombe
20th-century New Zealand politicians
Unsuccessful candidates in the 1957 New Zealand general election
New Zealand National Party politicians